Red Army Choir most commonly refers to:

Alexandrov Ensemble, an official army choir of the Russian armed forces
It may also refer to:
Rosgvardia Academic Song and Dance Ensemble, an official academic ensemble of the National Guard of Russia and the Russian Ministry of Internal Affairs